The  (IBS)  is an IBS Bank headquartered in Mogadishu, Somalia.

Overview
IBS Bank began operations on 11 October 2014 in Mogadishu. Its opening ceremony was attended by President Hassan Sheikh Mohamud, along with various cabinet ministers, businessmen, and other invited guests.

IBS was incorporated in July 2013. As of March 2015, it is one of six local banks with commercial licences issued by the Central Bank of Somalia. The company is the first international bank in the country in over twenty years.

The bank adheres to global compliance, auditing and risk-management standards. It also plans to retain the auditor services of the US-based accountancy firm Deloitte.
Additionally, the IBS Bank in March 2015 launched a $10 million public share offering. Investment share tranches were valued at between $500 and $500,000. The public share offer was 10% of the share capital, with an additional 31% percent owned by IBS' founders. Banks based in the United Arab Emirates were among the interested potential stakeholders. Further equity is expected to be made available as the bank grows in size.

The IBS Bank was founded by Somali entrepreneurs, who are primarily based in Dubai. Mahat Mohammed Ahmed serves as the bank's Chief Executive Officer.

IBS Bank is in partnership with MasterCard, Visa, USAID GEEL program and ILO. In July 2019, IBS bank launched its partnership with World Elite MasterCard debt cards.

Services 
IBS provides personal banking, commercial banking, wholesale banking, investment banking and Takaful to clients. Its services include trade finance, mortgages, deposits, overdrafts, project funds.

The bank is also slated to offer online banking and a mobile banking application.

Branches
IBS Bank has seven branches in main districts of Mogadishu and four branches in the cities Garowe, Kismayo, Bosaso, and Baidoa. It has also received license to operate in the republic of Somaliland.

Awards 
IBS Bank have been awarded in 2016 and 2017 for the Bank of the Year award by the Somali Annual Business Awards (SABA Awards).

See also

Salaam Somali Bank
Premier Bank
List of Banks in Somalia and Somaliland

References

External links

Banks of Somalia
Companies based in Mogadishu
2014 establishments in Somalia
Banks established in 2014